Court of Justice of Maranhão (in Portuguese: Tribunal de Justiça do Maranhão, or TJMA) is a Brazilian judicial court. The judicial court has federal judges to monitor and combat corruption. The current president is federal judge, Tyrone Silva.

External links 
 Official website of Court of Justice of Maranhão

References 

Judiciary of Brazil
Subnational supreme courts
1813 establishments in Brazil
Courts and tribunals established in 1813
Government of Maranhão